Missouri's 4th congressional district comprises west central Missouri. It stretches from Columbia to the southern suburbs of Kansas City, including a sliver of Kansas City itself.

The district is predominantly rural and relatively conservative; George W. Bush defeated John Kerry 64% to 35% in the 2004 election and John McCain defeated Barack Obama 61% to 38% in the 2008 election. The district is currently represented by Mark Alford, a Republican. 

This district had historically been a Democratic Party stronghold.  Antipathy to the Republican Party had its origins in the American Civil War and the infamous General Order 11.  The Union Army ordered evacuation of the county in an attempt to reduce support for and the power of bushwhacker guerrillas. After the Civil War, there was disfranchisement of white males (mostly Democrats) who had been active for the Confederacy until they took loyalty oaths, or until 1870. The area was filled with conflict between Missouri's Radicals, who joined the Republicans, and Conservatives, who were Democrats. By 1880 former secessionists dominated Missouri's congressional delegation and state legislature.

Gradually this area developed a character similar to yellow dog Democrat districts in the South.  Until 2010, only one Republican had been elected here since the Great Depression, and only for one term.  However, several demographic trends have converged to erode the Democratic base in this district.  First, as the New York Times election maps show, the predominantly rural counties lining the Missouri River have sharply trended Republican between the 2000 Senate election and the 2006 election, following trends across the South.

Secondly, population losses in Kansas City resulted in the 4th gradually losing much of its share of heavily Democratic Jackson County to the Kansas City-based 5th district. Until 1983, the district stretched as far as Independence on Kansas City's eastern border; as late as 1973 it included the eastern portion of Kansas City itself. To compensate for the loss of territory closer to Kansas City, large portions of heavily Republican Southwest Missouri were reassigned from the neighboring 7th district.  The result of these trends resulted in a dramatic collapse of Democratic support in the district. Al Gore, John Kerry, and Barack Obama won less than 40% of the vote here. It ultimately presaged Ike Skelton's defeat by Vicky Hartzler in 2010. Since Skelton's defeat, no Democrat has managed even 40 percent of the vote.

List of members representing the district

Election Results

2010 Election

2012 Election

2014 Election

2016 Election

2018 Election

2020 Election

Counties
There is a total of 24 counties included in MO-04.

Election results from presidential races

2008 Presidential Election Results by County
The table below shows how individual counties in MO-04 voted in the 2008 presidential election. U.S. Senator John McCain (R-Arizona) won every single county in MO-04 and swept the district with 60.58 percent of the vote while U.S. Senator Barack Obama (D-Illinois) received 37.87 percent, a 22.71-percent margin of victory for the GOP.

2008 Missouri Democratic Presidential Primary Election Results by County
The table below shows how individual counties in MO-04 voted in the 2008 Missouri Democratic Presidential Primary. Former U.S. Senator Hillary Rodham Clinton (D-New York) swept the district by a convincing margin over U.S. Senator Barack Obama (D-Illinois). Clinton won every county in the district with the exception of Cole County, home of the State Capitol.

Historical district boundaries

See also

Missouri's congressional districts
List of United States congressional districts

References

 Congressional Biographical Directory of the United States 1774–present

04
Constituencies established in 1847
1847 establishments in Missouri
Constituencies disestablished in 1933
1933 disestablishments in Missouri
Constituencies established in 1935
1935 establishments in Missouri